America's Super Showcase was a one-time variety special that aired on ABC on April 5, 1992, as a crossover episode on "America's Funniest People". The special opened as the latter show, then host Kevin Meaney joined Dave Coulier and Arleen Sorkin on the stage and introduced the show.

Segments
The Rhino Records band Big Daddy was the house band.

The first segment featured magician/comedian The Amazing Johnathan who demonstrated many comedy props, such as the Mole In The Back routine and then picked a random audience member and engaged him in a question round and if he won, he would receive a $100 bill (which was actually a $20 bill).

The second segment featured a juggling trio called The Flaming Idiots in which they juggled bowling pins and then did an act called "Human Juggling".

Also included were a European comedy team called "Lacawski and Siegel" who would slap their chests to the tune of the William Tell Overture; a Ventriloquist Lynn Tuxster performed an act with three audience members; Prop comedians Carrot Top and Mike Bent performed comedy skits; and Kevin Meaney closed the show by lip-synching "We Are The World" and imitating the singers who originally participated in the song.

Background
The show was executive produced by Vin Di Bona. Additional episodes were taped but never aired.

References

1992 television specials